Allopiophila is a genus of small flies in the family Piophilidae.

Species
A. arctica (Holmgren, 1883)
A. atrifrons (Melander & Spuler, 1917)
A. baechlii (Merz, 1996)
A. calceata (Duda, 1924)
A. dudai (Frey, 1930)
A. flavipes (Zetterstedt, 1847)
A. fulviceps (Holmgren, 1883)
A. lonchaeoides (Zetterstedt, 1838)
A. luteata Haliday, 1833
A. nigerrima (Lundbeck, 1901)
A. nitidissima (Melander & Spuler, 1917)
A. pappi Ozerov, 2004
A. pectiniventris (Duda, 1924)
A. penicillata (Steyskal, 1964)
A. pseudovulgaris (Ozerov, 1989)
A. testacea (Melander, 1924)
A. tomentosa (Frey, 1930)
A. vernicosa (Ozerov & Bartak, 1993)
A. vulgaris (Fallén, 1820)
A. xanthopoda (Melander & Spuler, 1917)

References 

Schizophora genera
Piophilidae